Cardonnette is a commune in the Somme department in Hauts-de-France in northern France.

Geography

Population

Points of interest
 The church, rebuilt after World War I.

See also
Communes of the Somme department

References

External links

 Official website 

Communes of Somme (department)